The Genius of Victory is a 1532–1534 marble sculpture by Michelangelo, produced as part of a design for the tomb of Pope Julius II. It is 2.61 m high and is now in the Salone dei Cinquecento of the Palazzo Vecchio in Florence.

History 
The exact date of execution of the statue is unknown, but it is usually related to the project for the tomb of Julius II. It is thought to have been intended for one of the lower niches of one of the last projects for the tomb, perhaps that of 1532 for which the so-called Captives or "Provinces" now in the Galleria dell'Accademia of Florence may have also been made. On the other hand, the monument may have been coupled with a similar pair of fighters, a clay model in the Casa Buonarroti – the so-called Hercules-Samson.

With the famous statue unfinished, Victory forms an interesting footnote in history: left in the artist's studio after his final departure from Florence in 1534, it became the property of his nephew Leonardo Buonarroti, who first tried to sell it in 1544 without obtaining the necessary authorization from his uncle. Then, at the suggestion of Daniele da Volterra, he tried to place it on Michelangelo's tomb in Santa Croce (1564), but Giorgio Vasari, who was redesigning the church's interior, was against it being used there. At Vasari's suggestion, the statue was given to Duke Cosimo I de' Medici that year.  Two early "Captives" originally intended for Julius's tomb ended up in France, while four larger figures, created much later, now in Florence's Accademia, were initially placed in Buontalenti's Grotto in the Boboli Gardens, after the artist's death. The Victory came to decorate the Salone dei Cinquecento of the Palazzo Vecchio. It was placed along the wall, among other victory groups inspired by Michelangelo's, such as the statues of the Labors of Hercules by Vincenzo de' Rossi and others.

In 1868, three years after the opening of the National Museum of the Bargello, the statue was included in the collection of Florentine sculpture gathered in the museum. It was returned to the Palazzo Vecchio on 6 November 1921, and placed in a niche in the center of the back wall of the room, where, since the time Florence had been the capital of Italy (1865), the 19th-century statue of Savonarola had stood (now in Piazza Savonarola). Only in recent years has the Victory been restored to its former position along the right wall.

Description and style
The dating and attribution of the statue to the project of the tomb are based on stylistic elements that link the work to the Captives: the twisting of the body and the vigorous anatomy, as well as comparable proportions. In addition, the head has a crown of oak leaves that allude to the Della Rovere emblem.
The sculpture does not represent a moment of fighting, but rather serves as an allegory of victoriousness. It depicts the winner who dominates the submissive loser with great agility, with one leg that blocks the body of the captive, who is folded and chained. The young man who is the victor is beautiful and elegant, while the dominated man is old and bearded, and dressed in the garb of an ancient Roman warrior. The surfaces are treated expressively to enhance the contrast between the two figures: the young polished to perfection, the old rough and incomplete, still retaining the compressed boulder-like solidity of the heavy stone from which it was made.

According to some scholars, the inspiration for the titular figure was Tommaso dei Cavalieri, a young Roman nobleman known to Michelangelo in Rome in 1532, to whom he dedicated love poems, and the older figure alludes to Michelangelo himself.

Further reading
 Umberto Baldini, Michelangelo scultore, Rizzoli, Milan 1973.
 Howard Hibbard, Michelangelo, New York, 1974.
 Marta Alvárez Gonzalez, Michelangelo, Art Mondadori, Milan 2007.

See also 
 List of works by Michelangelo

References

External links
Catalog entry
Palazzo Vecchio entry

Tomb of Pope Julius II
Sculptures by Michelangelo
Marble sculptures in Italy
1530s sculptures
Palazzo Vecchio